Alex Christophe Dupont (born 22 November 1960), best known as Leos Carax, is a French film director, critic and writer. Carax is noted for his poetic style and his tortured depictions of love. His first major work was Boy Meets Girl (1984), and his notable works include Les Amants du Pont-Neuf (1991), Holy Motors (2012) and Annette (2021). For the last, he won the Cannes Film Festival Award for Best Director at the 2021 Cannes Film Festival. His professional name is an anagram of his real name, 'Alex', and 'Oscar'.

Early life
Carax was born Alex Christophe Dupont in Suresnes, Hauts-de-Seine, a commune in the suburbs of Paris, France. His mother is American and his father is French.

Career
Carax's film career began with a series of short films, and as a film critic, before he released Boy Meets Girl (1984), which established his reputation for a mature visual style. It also saw the first grouping of Carax with Denis Lavant and cinematographer Jean-Yves Escoffier. His next film was Mauvais Sang (literally Bad Blood but mostly known as The Night is Young) in 1986, which alienated some of his audience, but continued to explore the complexities of love in the modern world, this time through a darker, more criminal viewpoint. The work was clearly an homage to French New Wave cinema, and his use of such actresses as Juliette Binoche was a tribute to his influences, especially Jean-Luc Godard. The film was entered into the 37th Berlin International Film Festival.

Five years later, Carax returned to directing with Les Amants du Pont-Neuf, an expensive undertaking as Parisian authorities granted him only 10 days to film on Pont Neuf. His initial reaction to the problems of filming on a public bridge had been to construct a model of the bridge in the community of Lansargues, in Southern France. But on the first day of filming Lavant severely injured his thumb, which pushed the movie back by a month. Subsequent financial difficulties further pushed filming over a much longer period than intended. The movie was released to critical acclaim and opened the door for Carax to enter more experimental waters with his fourth feature, Pola X (1999), an adaptation of Herman Melville's Pierre: or, The Ambiguities.

Carax's 2012 film Holy Motors also stars Lavant. The film competed for the Palme d'Or at the 2012 Cannes Film Festival. In 2021, Carax directed Annette, a music-filled drama feature film written by Sparks and starring Adam Driver and Marion Cotillard. In 2017, Carax performed vocals and accordion on the Sparks track When You're a French Director from its album Hippopotamus.

Filmography

Director

Films

Music videos

As actor

References

Further reading
Leos Carax by Fergus Daly and Garin Dowd. Published by Manchester University Press, 2003, .

External links
 
 
 "Alex in the City: Fergus Daly offers a brief guide to the fall and rise of Leos Carax"
 Interview with Carax on Pola X
 Alternate music video by Carax for the song "Crystal" by New Order at Google Video.
 Interview with Carax on funding for Pola X at YouTube.
 Carax's 1997 short film Sans Titre at YouTube.
 Carax's "my last minute", a short film at YouTube.
 Foco - Revista de Cinema, special edition devoted to Leos Carax
 

1960 births
Living people
People from Suresnes
French film directors
French male screenwriters
French screenwriters
French film critics
French male film actors
French experimental filmmakers
French people of American descent
French male non-fiction writers
Cannes Film Festival Award for Best Director winners
Postmodernist filmmakers